TechniSat is a German manufacturer of direct broadcast satellite receivers. The company produces televisions, car navigation and entertainment systems as well. Together with Loewe and Metz, it is one of the few remaining independent consumer electronics companies which develop and produce consumer electronics products in Germany and Europe.

History
TechniSat was established in 1987 in Daun by Peter Lepper.  In 1992, the company launched then the smallest digital antenna in the world. In 2007, it started its own TechniTipp-TV channel, which was closed down in September 2008.

In 2009, TechniSat had a revenue of nearly 350 million Euro (up from 305 million in 2008).

References

External links 
 

Electronics companies of Germany
Privately held companies of Germany
Companies based in Rhineland-Palatinate
German brands
Computer hardware companies